English Township is a township in Iowa County, Iowa, USA.

History
English Township was established in 1847.

References

Townships in Iowa County, Iowa
Townships in Iowa
1847 establishments in Iowa